Pramila Patten (or Navamanee Ratna Patten, born 29 June 1958) is a Mauritian barrister, women's rights activist, and United Nations official, who currently serves as the United Nations Special Representative on Sexual Violence in Conflict and Under-Secretary-General of the United Nations; she was appointed in 2017. Her office was established by Security Council Resolution 1888, introduced by Hillary Clinton, and she succeeded Margot Wallström and Zainab Bangura.

Patten served as a member of the United Nations Committee on the Elimination of Discrimination Against Women from 2003 to 2017, and was the committee's vice chairperson.

Life 
Pramila Patten obtained a Bachelor of Laws (LL.B.) at the University of London, a Diploma in Criminology at King's College, Cambridge, a Master of Laws (LL.M.) at the University of London and was called to the bar in England as a member of Gray's Inn. She practiced as a barrister in England from 1982 to 1986 before she returned to Mauritius, where she served as a district court judge between 1987 and 1988, and from 1987 to 1992 as a lecturer at the Faculty of Law of the University of Mauritius. Since 1995, she has been the director of the law firm Patten & Co Chambers.

She was a member of the International Women's Rights Action Watch between 1993 and 2002, and from 2000 to 2004 she was a consultant to the Ministry of Women's Rights, Child Development and Family Welfare.

Patten was elected as a member of the United Nations Committee on the Elimination of Discrimination Against Women in 2003. At times, she served as the committee's vice chairperson. In 2017, she resigned from the committee and on 12 April 2017, she was appointed by UN Secretary-General António Guterres as Special Representative on Sexual Violence in Conflict with the rank of Under-Secretary-General of the United Nations.

In November 2017, she visited Bangladesh to interview survivors of the 2016 Rohingya persecution in Myanmar.

That same month, she welcomed the Elsie Initiative to help increase women's participation in peacekeeping operations in a joint statement with fellow UN Under-Secretary-General and Executive Director of UN Women Phumzile Mlambo-Ngcuka.

On 16 November 2022, she received an Honorary Doctorate from the University of Ottawa in recognition of her exceptional achievements and contributions to society, particularly regarding the issue of women, peace and security.

References 

British barristers
British women lawyers
20th-century Mauritian judges
Alumni of University of London Worldwide
Alumni of the University of London
United Nations Committee on the Elimination of Discrimination against Women members
Under-Secretaries-General of the United Nations
1958 births
Living people
Mauritian officials of the United Nations
Special Representatives of the Secretary-General of the United Nations
21st-century Mauritian lawyers